The men's 100 metres event at the 1993 Summer Universiade was held at the UB Stadium in Buffalo, United States on 14 and 15 July 1993.

Medalists

Results

Heats
Wind:Heat 6: -0.6 m/s

Quarterfinals
Wind:Heat 1: 0.0 m/s

Semifinals
Wind:Heat 1: +1.6 m/s, Heat 2: +3.4 m/s

Final

Wind: +2.6 m/s

References

Athletics at the 1993 Summer Universiade
1993